Eduardo Nonato N. Joson (born August 31, 1950) is a Filipino politician. He served as governor of Nueva Ecija from 1995 to 1998. He was also a member of the House of Representatives of the Philippines, and represented the First District of Nueva Ecija from 1987 to 1992, and again from 2007 to 2010.

He is the second son of former Nueva Ecija Governor Eduardo Joson Sr. 

He also served as administrator of National Food Authority from 1998 to 2000.

References

External links
Biography at the House of Representatives website

Members of the House of Representatives of the Philippines from Nueva Ecija
1950 births
Living people
People from Nueva Ecija
Aksyon Demokratiko politicians
Lakas–CMD (1991) politicians
Members of the Batasang Pambansa
Governors of Nueva Ecija